Trench 11 is a 2017 Canadian horror/thriller film directed by Leo Scherman. The movie stars Rossif Sutherland, Robert Stadlober, Charlie Carrick, Shaun Benson, Ted Atherton, Luke Humphrey, Jeff Strome, Adam Hurtig, and Karine Vanasse. The setting takes place near the end of the First World War where a group of Allied soldiers are sent to investigate a secret German bunker and discover the horrors that lay beneath it.

The film's development began in 2011 with its filming beginning in late 2016 in Winnipeg, Canada.

Plot 
In 1918, in the Western Front in France, Lieutenant Berton, a Canadian tunneller, digs 78 feet beneath a German position to rescue other tunnellers. Berton accidentally startles a survivor who ends up screaming, alerting the Germans above. The Germans then detonate charges above Berton, trapping him underground for twelve days.

Three months later, on November 2, 1918, a pair of British Army officers from the Intelligence Corps, Major Jennings and Dr. Priest, debrief Colonel Ashcroft with information on a deep underground German bunker called "Trench 11", hidden deep within the Argonne Forest. The base is commanded by a German officer named Reiner (who is called "The Prophet" by his men) who specializes in the development of various chemical and biological weapons. Jennings and Dr. Priest believe that Trench 11 (so named because it is eleven miles behind German lines) is used as a base of operations for Reiner to make more weapons and request for the bunker to be investigated as the Germans failed to destroy it during their retreat. Due to the fact that the Argonne Forest lies within the American sector of the front, Colonel Ashcroft arranges for a U.S. Army escort and allows Jennings to retrieve Berton from his leave to help with their investigation. During his leave, Berton enters in a romantic relationship with a French woman named Veronique but is forced to leave when he is retrieved to aid Major Jennings' investigation.

Berton accompanies Maj. Jennings and Dr. Priest to Trench 11 along with their American escorts: Captain Cooper, Sergeant Pronger, and Private Kelly. Upon locating Trench 11, the group discover dead German soldiers in the trenches. It is revealed that the German Army had shelled Trench 11 prior to the Allied soldiers arriving there.

At the headquarters of the German 5th Army, the German high command orders Reiner and Capt. Mueller to erase all evidence of the nature of Trench 11 (called "Wotan Complex" by the Germans) to prevent the Allies from discovering it as Reiner failed to detonate the explosives inside during their retreat. Mueller, who is disgusted by Reiner's work, is ordered to escort Reiner to the bunker to get the job done.

In the trench, the group discover evidence of German infighting and sabotages. Descending underground they come upon a sealed door and a German soldier who was left behind. The soldier frantically begs the group not to open the door but Jennings orders his men to ignore him. The German soldier then hysterically begs and pressures Cooper into shooting him. The group moves deeper into the bunker and are attacked by a crazed man who vomits on Kelly and rips a grenade off Pronger. Berton tosses the grenade away but collapses the tunnel they came from. Jennings orders Berton and Cooper to split and search for an exit while he, Dr. Priest, Pronger and Kelly investigate further down.

While searching for an exit Berton and Cooper are ambushed by more crazed men. Cooper is stabbed by one and both are forced to fight them off and flee. Simultaneously Jennings, Priest, Pronger and Kelly discover a hospital room. Pronger is attacked by a crazed man but manages to kill him, alerting the group to a worm crawling out of the gunshot wound. Dr. Priests performs an autopsy on the deceased man and discover the man's body is full of worms and is responsible for his insane and violent behavior. Dr. Priests concludes the worms are not natural and were engineered. Pronger and Kelly stage a mutiny and demand they leave the bunker which ensues a standoff between them and Jennings. The group is then ambushed by German soldiers who kill Pronger and Jennings and take Kelly and Dr. Priest prisoner. Berton and Cooper discover an exit but are also taken prisoner.

After losing his tunneller to the infected (whom they needed to reactivate the charges), Mueller decides to recruit the group but Dr. Priest refuses to cooperate. Reiner, who was eavesdropping the whole time, singles out Dr. Priest for interrogation. Kelly's health deteriorates and he becomes sick.

Reiner interrogates Dr. Priest and tries to get him to relate to his twisted view on science. Dr. Priest figures out the worms were meant to kill livestock in the Allied countries but jumped species to infect humans. In turn, Reiner reveals that he marveled at the results and deliberately bred deadlier strains. Mueller escorts Berton, Cooper and Kelly into the lower levels where the charges is located but Kelly succumbs to the parasite and kills Cooper. Berton shoots Kelly and holds Mueller at gunpoint, but stands down after Mueller convinces him that the parasite will kill everyone if it ever gets out. Dr. Priest desperately tries to reason with Reiner not to use parasite for the sake of civilian lives, but Reiner remains adamant in using the parasite to destroy Europe and rebuild it under German rule. He then tortures Dr. Priest.

Mueller and Berton locate the charges and learn that the explosives were never rigged in the first place. After killing Dr. Priest, Reiner orders his men to seal the lower level and flood it with poison gas and begins to collect his parasites. Mueller and Berton are forced to flee and find another way to detonate the explosives. Berton tries to rig the explosive to a clock timer for a remote detonation but an infected soldier attacks them, breaking Mueller's leg and destroying the clock. Unable to move, Mueller stays behind and gives Berton time to arm any remaining explosives and escape. Berton finishes and reaches for the exit, but is shot in the leg by Reiner and his guard. Reiner then mocks and tortures Berton, who endures it to distract Reiner and his guard long enough for Mueller to detonate the explosives. The explosion catches both of them off guard, which allows Berton to kill the guard and engage Reiner in a brawl. Reiner attempts to flee but Berton trips him; resulting in his eye being impaled by a vial in his hand. The tunnel collapses on Reiner while Berton barely escapes. Berton limps away from the site and sees a vision of his lover Veronique; his ultimate fate is left ambiguous.

Cast

Production 
Development of the film begin in 2011 by producer Tyler Levine and his production company Carousel Pictures. Tyler partnered with Buffalo Gal Pictures to recruit various well known Canadian film crew. The crew includes Chad Giesbrecht (production designer), Dylan Macleod (cinematographer), Francois Dagenais (special makeup effects artist), Michael Munn (film editor), Martin Katz (executive producer), Walter Gasparovic (executive producer), Phyllis Laing (executive producer), and Isaac Clements (co-producer).

Telefilm Canada, The Harold Greenburg Fund, Manitoba Film and Music and the Cogeco Fund helped financed the film's development and production.

Production of the film began in late 2016 and was shot in Winnipeg, Canada. The director of the film, Leo Scherman, described that the biggest challenge in making the film was due to a limited budget for making Canadian films compared to films produced elsewhere (i.e. the United States). Leo stated that he was fortunate and thankful for the generous amount of financial support the film had behind it.

Release 
Trench 11 premiered in Canada during the Toronto After Dark Film Festival on October 15, 2017. It was later released in Mexico on October 27, 2017, during the Morbido Film Fest and the UK on April 21, 2018, during the Dead by Dawn Horror Film Festival. It was released in Canada for a second time (albeit limited) on August 31, 2018. On September 11, 2018, the film was released in the US through the internet.

Reception

Critical response 
On Rotten Tomatoes, the film holds an approval rating of 92%, based on 12 reviews, with an average rating of 6.33/10. Mike Hassler of Destroy the Brain! gave the film a score of 3.5/5, praising the film's atmosphere and Rossif Sutherland's performance but criticizing the film's lack of development for other characters and drab setting.

Awards 
Trench 11 won several awards from Toronto After Dark Film Festival in 2017. In 2018, the Canadian Society of Cinematographers nominated the film for CSC Award for Theatrical Feature Cinematography.

References

External links 
 
 
 Trench 11 at Library and Archives Canada
2017 films
2017 horror thriller films
2010s Canadian films
2010s horror thriller films
Canadian horror thriller films
Horror war films
English-language Canadian films
Western Front (World War I) films
Films shot in Winnipeg
Films about the United States Army
Canadian Armed Forces in films
Films set in France
Films set in 1918
Films set in bunkers
Biological weapons in popular culture